There are numerous ceremonies and customs adopted by the Nair caste, which is prominent in the South Indian state of Kerala.

Ceremonial art forms

Kalarippayattu

Kalarippayattu training was undertaken by every youth of the Nair community. However, it was not the sole prerogative of the Nairs, for Muslims, Christians, Ezhavas,Nadars and even Brahmins practiced and mastered the techniques of Kalarippayattu.

Shri Kallanthattil Gurukkal (a Nampoothiri Brahmin), Kshatriyas, King Marthanda Varma, Shri Pazhassiraja, Guru of Kallanthattil Gurukkal (a Kshatriya, Kolathiri rajah) all learned kalarippayattu. It was established by Parashuraman and Durga, Bhadrakali among others.

In ancient times, not only Nairs but also Kshatriyas and even Brahmins trained; however, Brahmins are prohibited from fighting, violence and taking arms.

Kathakali
Kathakali is a dance-drama which portrays scenes from Hindu epics or stories. It is a classical dance form of Kerala demanding long years of training. Believed to have evolved from Ramanattam, another classical art form composed by Kottarakkara Thampuran, Kathakali incorporates the techniques of some of the major ritual art forms of Kerala. The dance-drama was historically performed exclusively by Nairs and had always been associated with them. Nair rulers and chiefs patronized the art and Kathakali had foundations in Nair military training and religious customs.

Velakali
Velakali is a ritualistic martial arts form performed by Nair men in some temples of southern Kerala. The form depicts the fight between the Pandavas and Kauravas. It originated in Ambalappuzha, where Mathoor Panicker, chief of the Chempakasserri army, employed it to boost the martial spirit of the people. Dancers wear colorful and attractive costumes similar to that of the Nair soldiers of olden days. The dancers carry a painted shield in their left hand and a stick (Churikakkol) in their right hand. The performance resembles actions in a battle. Percussion instruments like thavil, shudha madhalam, elathalam, kombu, and kuzhal are used.

Earlier customs and traditions

Marumakkathayam and Tharavadu

Marumakkathayam is matrilineality. Tharavad is a subclan-household, which was matrilineal for Nairs, headed by the eldest male member of the family (known as Karanavan) while other male members were known as Anandravan.

Sambandham (an earlier form of marriage) and related customs 
In the past (before 1937 in Cochin, before  1928 in Travancore and before 1933 in Malabar) Nairs had three major marriage/rite of passage ceremonies. Kettu Kalyanam (mock marriage ceremony/ auspicious ceremony), Thirandu Kalyanam (menstrual ceremony) and Gunadosha-Sambandham/Pudamuri/Pudavakoda (cloth-giving ceremony, actual union).

Kettu Kalyanam (mock marriage ceremony)
Elaborate auspicious ceremony that resembles real marriage of patrilineal castes. Tali-tying rite. Regarded as a relic of the past (before ~1200) when Nairs too were patrilineal.

Sambandham/Podamuri/Pudava Koda/Mundukoda (lit.cloth-giving. Marriage alliance, where divorce is permitted, unlike in Vedic Vivaha)

The Sambandham ritual was less religious than the thaali and puberty rites, and literally means "alliance" or "relationship". It was a form of marriage alliance between men and women following marumakkathayam. The ritual was comparatively simple. It involves the groom, of same or higher subcaste/caste of the bride, whose horoscope has been checked and matched with that of the bride, giving a piece of cloth (Pudava) to the bride in front of a lit lamp (symbolizing Agni) and eight auspicious objects (Ashtamangalyam), witnessed by the bride's kin and the groom's friends/kin. Sambandham was not necessarily a permanent arrangement (unlike Vedic Vivaha of Brahmins and many other castes, where the concept of divorce did not exist), even though in many or most cases it was lifelong. However it was this innate weakness, i.e. divorce being permitted, of sambandham that helped maintain the integrity of the matrilineal tharavadu.

Sambandham can denote hypergamy between Nair women and Namboothiri men as well. Among the Namboodiris only the eldest son was permitted to marry (Veli, or Vedic Vivaha) within his own caste (primogeniture) to maintain the integrity of ancestral property. The remaining younger sons contracted Sambandhams with Kshatriya or Samantan princesses, Ambalavasi or Nair ladies. Since the offspring of these alliances were, as per Marumakkathayam, legally members of their mothers castes and families, the Namboodiri father would not be legally obliged to provide for them, but in most cases would give a part of self-acquired property. This was known as Putravakasham (son's right) or Acchankoduthathu (father's gift). For the matrilineal castes, Sambandhams with Brahmins were a matter of prestige and social status. Thus Sambandham was in both ways a gain to the castes involved. Namboodiri-Kshatriya and Namboodiri-Nair Sambandhams may also be considered morganatic marriages, for while the husband was of higher social status and the mother of relatively lower status, the children were still considered legitimate although they did not inherit the titles or wealth of their fathers. However, Marxist and feminist anthropologist Kathleen Gough argues that there is little evidence that polyandry was rarely practiced in few areas before 1800, while famous Kerala historian and anthropologist K. M. Panikkar has stated that "Nairs have no tradition of polyandry" in his 1918 paper about Nairs published by the Royal Anthropological Institute.

In the case of sambandham with Namboothiri men, the system benefited both the Namboothiri Brahmins as well as matrilineal castes like the Nairs for two reasons. First, Namboothiri Brahmins had institutionalized primogeniture, permitting only the eldest son to marry within the caste. Younger sons (also called aphans) in Namboothiri families were expected to establish sambandham with Nair, Ambalavasi (temple service caste), royal Samantan or Kshatriya women. This allowed Nambudiri Brahmins to have more influence through close blood-relations with the ruling elite and martial castes. Secondly, Nair families encouraged the sambandham arrangement with Namboothiri men, who were not involved in warfare and provided stable alliances, also increasing their tharavadu and caste status.

References

Culture of Kerala
Indian castes